Chambrelien railway station is a railway station in the municipality of Rochefort, in the Swiss canton of Neuchâtel. It is a reversing station on the standard gauge Neuchâtel–Le Locle-Col-des-Roches line of Swiss Federal Railways.

Services 
The following services stop at Chambrelien:

Gallery

References

External links 
 
 

Railway stations in the canton of Neuchâtel
Swiss Federal Railways stations